"Dance Little Jean" is a song written by Jimmy Ibbotson, and recorded by American country music group Nitty Gritty Dirt Band.  It was released in October 1983 as the second single from the album Let's Go.  The song reached number 9 on the Billboard Hot Country Singles & Tracks chart.

Background and writing
Jimmy Ibbotson wrote the song hoping the charm and romance of the story would convince his ex-wife that they should get back together. Little Jean was named for his real life daughter who would always dance when he played guitar. When he played it for his ex-wife for the first time, Little Jean danced, but his ex-wife's response was not what he had hoped for. She told him he would be able to afford child support now, because that song would be a hit.

Content
The song is about a musician disillusioned about marriage, whose heart is softened by a daughter dancing to his band at her parents' wedding reception whilst wearing crinolines and a calico skirt.

Chart performance

References

Songs about dancing
1983 singles
1983 songs
Nitty Gritty Dirt Band songs
Warner Records singles
Songs written by Jimmy Ibbotson